William Peverel († 28. January 1114), Latinised to Gulielmus Piperellus), was a Norman knight granted lands in England following the Norman Conquest.

Origins
Little is known of the origin of the William Peverel the Elder.  Of his immediate family, only the name of a brother, Robert, is known.  J. R. Planché derives the surname from the Latin puerulus, the diminutive form of puer (a boy), thus "a small boy", or from the Latin noun piper, meaning "pepper".

Lands held in England
William Peverel was a favourite of William the Conqueror.  He was greatly honoured after the Norman Conquest, and received as his reward over a hundred manors in central England from the king.  In 1086, the Domesday Book records William as holding the substantial number of 162 manors, forming collectively the Honour of Peverel, in Nottinghamshire and Derbyshire, including Nottingham Castle. He also built Peveril Castle, Castleton, Derbyshire. William Peverel is amongst the people explicitly recorded in the Domesday Book as having built castles.

He is considered first Sheriff of Nottinghamshire, Derbyshire and the Royal Forests

Marriage and children
William married Adeline, who bore him four children: two sons both named William, one dying childless, the other often called William Peverel the Younger, and two daughters, Maud and Adeliza, who married Richard de Redvers.

References

Bibliography

1040s births
1110s deaths
Anglo-Normans
People from Derbyshire